Werner Nüesch (1904 – 1954) was a Swiss athlete. He competed in the men's shot put at the 1924 Summer Olympics and the 1928 Summer Olympics.

References

External links
 

1904 births
1954 deaths
Athletes (track and field) at the 1924 Summer Olympics
Athletes (track and field) at the 1928 Summer Olympics
Swiss male shot putters
Swiss male discus throwers
Olympic athletes of Switzerland
Place of birth missing